Kuje Science Primary School is a primary school in Kuje, Nigeria. After  reconstruction funded largely by British Airways' charity program "Change for Good",  it was re-opened in 2002 in a ceremony attended by President Olusegun Obasanjo. This event took place two days before the anniversary of the introduction of the most widely accepted human rights treaty in history; The United Nations Convention on the Rights of the Child. It has over 3,500 students.

"Kuje school is an excellent example of what a committed and generous public and private sector partnership can achieve," said Dr Christian Voumard, UNICEF Representative in Nigeria. "It is the largest project funded by Change for Good in Africa and is yet another example of how private sector funds can be put to very good use within the public domain," he added. Basic amenities which are not available to many schools in the country include an electricity generator, a supply of clean water, and separate toilets for boys and girls. The school also has a library and a computer and science laboratory; offering a stark contrast to those facilities offered by the majority of schools in the country.

UNICEF and British Airways hope that Kuje school will lead the way in influencing and spurring much needed changes to Nigeria's education system.

"We were very happy and eager to work with UNICEF on this initiative," said Steven Harrison, British Airways' manager in Nigeria. "We are delighted that through the highly successful Change for Good program, we have rebuilt this school, which is certain to make a positive contribution to the education of thousands of Nigerian children."

References 
 Unicef press release

Primary schools in Nigeria
Federal Capital Territory (Nigeria)
Rebuilt buildings and structures in Nigeria